João Sabino Mendes Neto Saraiva (born 21 October 1994), known as Mendes, is a Portuguese professional footballer who plays for G.D. Chaves as a midfielder.

Club career
Born in Matosinhos, Porto District, Mendes played youth football for four clubs, notably having two spells at local Leixões SC. He spent his first four seasons as a senior in the third division, representing in quick succession Gondomar SC, CD Gouveia, A.D. Nogueirense, CD Operário and U.D. Oliveirense. In 2016–17, he scored three goals in 27 matches to help the latter team to promotion to the LigaPro.

Mendes made his professional debut with Oliveirense on 27 August 2017, coming on as a second-half substitute in a 1–0 away loss against F.C. Famalicão. He scored his first goal in division two the following 11 April, but in a 3–2 away defeat to C.D. Cova da Piedade.

In the summer of 2018, Mendes signed with Primeira Liga side C.D. Tondela on a one-year loan deal. He appeared in his first game in the competition on 2 December, replacing Bruno Monteiro in the first half of the 3–2 loss at Portimonense SC; the move was made permanent at the end of that spell.

Mendes was loaned to Académica de Coimbra of the second tier on 30 August 2019.

References

External links

1994 births
Living people
Sportspeople from Matosinhos
Portuguese footballers
Association football midfielders
Primeira Liga players
Liga Portugal 2 players
Campeonato de Portugal (league) players
Leixões S.C. players
Gondomar S.C. players
CD Operário players
U.D. Oliveirense players
C.D. Tondela players
Associação Académica de Coimbra – O.A.F. players
G.D. Estoril Praia players
G.D. Chaves players